Protocol may refer to:

Sociology and politics
 Protocol (politics), a formal agreement between nation states
 Protocol (diplomacy), the etiquette of diplomacy and affairs of state
 Etiquette, a code of personal behavior

Science and technology
 Protocol (science), a predefined written procedural method of conducting experiments
 Medical protocol (disambiguation)

Computing
 Protocol (object-oriented programming), a common means for unrelated objects to communicate with each other (sometimes also called interfaces)
 Communication protocol, a defined set of rules and regulations that determine how data is transmitted in telecommunications and computer networking
 Cryptographic protocol, a protocol for encrypting messages
 Decentralized network protocol, a protocol for operation of an open source peer-to-peer network where no single entity nor colluding group controls a majority of the network nodes

Music
 Protocol (album), by Simon Phillips
 Protocol (band), a British band
 "Protocol", a song by Gordon Lightfoot from the album Summertime Dream
 "Protocol", a song by the Vamps from their 2020 album Cherry Blossom

Other uses
 Protocol (film), a 1984 comedy film
 Protocol (website), an offshoot of Politico
 Minutes, also known as protocols, the written record of a meeting
 Protocol, a news website owned by Capitol News Company

See also
 Proprietary protocol, a communications protocol owned by a single organization or individual
 Proto (disambiguation)
 Quantum cryptography protocol, a protocol for encrypting messages
 The Protocols of the Elders of Zion, a notorious antisemitic hoax that has circulated since the early 20th century